High Road is the fourth studio album by American singer and songwriter Kesha. It was released on January 31, 2020, through RCA and Kemosabe Records. Announced in late 2019, the album saw the singer once again taking over the role of sole executive producer, following Rainbow (2017). She collaborated with various songwriters and record producers to achieve her desired sonority, combining elements of her career beginnings and Rainbow. Musically, High Road is primarily a pop, country and classic rock record, although it encompasses a variety of genres, including dance-pop, folk, electronic pop, synthpop, trip hop, electro, EDM, trap, dream pop, hip hop, and gospel.

High Road was met with mostly positive reviews from music critics. The singer's reapproach of her partying personality was targeted by both positive and negative evaluations. The album debuted at number seven on the US Billboard 200 albums chart, making it Kesha's fourth top-ten album in the country. It was supported by four singles: "Raising Hell" featuring Big Freedia, "My Own Dance", "Resentment", and "Tonight". Kesha was set to embark on the High Road Tour to promote the album, but the tour was ultimately cancelled due to the COVID-19 pandemic.

Background and release 
After the release of Rainbow, her third studio album, Kesha issued a new single titled "Rich, White, Straight Men" in June 2019. It was initially uploaded onto her YouTube account on June 2 without prior announcement and was made available in online music stores and streaming platforms six days later. In September 2019, Billboard published a cover story about the singer, in which she announced that her fourth studio album was in development and would be released in following December. Whilst discussing the lyrics of the album, Kesha commented that it would emphasize "the happiness that I began my career with", although "more earned and healthier than ever". Musically, it would define a "full return to Kesha's pop roots, after leaning into a more country–soul sound" in Rainbow. Kesha worked with some previous partners, such as Wrabel, Nate Ruess, and her mother Pebe Sebert, as well as new collaborators, including Justin Tranter, Tayla Parx, and Dan Reynolds of Imagine Dragons.

In October 2019, the album's artwork and track listing were unveiled. In December 2019, RCA Records announced that additional songs would be included in the track listing. The record's release date was postponed to January 10 and later to January 31, 2020.  On the eve of the album's street date, Kesha revealed via Twitter that she had finalized a song titled "Summer" five days earlier. It was included as the closing track on digital versions of High Road.

The cover art for High Road depicts a melting candle made from a 3D scan of Kesha's head, which Dezeen described as "psychedelic". The image for the album were created by Brian Roettinger, a graphic designer who has worked with Jay Z, Childish Gambino and Florence and the Machine. Roetting explained that the melting candle represented that "nothing is permanent" as well as harkening to Kesha's exploration of themes of "joy" found in her earlier work. Kesha also sold the replicas of candle as merchandise for the album. Roettinger also served as the art director for the album and corresponding tour. Roettinger also used the motif of melting wax for Kesha's performance at the American Music Awards.

Composition

Music and lyrics 
Musically, High Road has been described as a "full-blown" pop, electro, country and classic rock record, utilizing musical and vocal characteristics of other music genres, such as hip hop, and electronic music. Lyrically, the album addresses themes of romantic relationships, friendships, self-empowerment, family, and escapism. In the early stages of the album, Kesha's brother suggested that she make uptempo songs as in the past, but she rejected the idea because she didn't want to meet the audience's expectations. After the release of Rainbow, whose main motto was the trauma that Kesha experienced and was experiencing at the time, she decided to get closer to a "party girl" personality, who was present and helped to build the singer's public identity during the beginning of her career, especially in the Animal era. Along with the singer's visuals, Rainbow lyrical and musical elements were unusual in relation to her previous works due to its more optimistic and sentimental approach. On High Road, she chose to blend the different approaches in an attempt to make them coexist in her personality. Laura Snapes of The Guardian affirms that High Road builds a new figure for Kesha's music "in the way that Tina Turner and Rihanna did after rejecting their own victim narratives", referring to the legal battle against Dr. Luke.

Songs and lyrical content 
The album's standard edition contains 15 tracks. It opens with "Tonight", a "bass-bumping" electropop composition. It begins as an "emotive" piano-driven ballad followed by a hip hop- and EDM-influenced breakdown with a "low-riding bassline" and a "buzzed beat" that sees the singer rapping. Kesha stated that "Tonight" is a "celebratory" song about "fucking up what I have". The following track, "My Own Dance", sees the singer addressing the expectations placed upon her and her music. It has been described as a "bold statement about not being the thing people expect, or demand, you to be" which "finds her speaking her mind and making it clear that she's not going to dance for you because she's here to dance for herself". Both "Tonight" and "My Own Dance" were compared to Kesha's debut single "Tik Tok".

The "dance-floor inferno" lead single "Raising Hell" features guest vocals by Big Freedia and is a blend of multiple genres including gospel, EDM, country, and bounce. Compared to the single "Timber", which Kesha was featured on, it features beat drops accompanied by "soaring synth beats", gospel choirs, handclaps, a church organ, horns, and a post-chorus by Freedia. In the title track, Kesha makes fun of people "who think she's too much of an airhead to write hits or even spell her own name". "Shadow" is a piano ballad that "demonstrates Kesha's ability to cohesively present all facets of her talent" and questions her right to be happy. The song was compared to Kesha's 2017 song "Praying" and purposefully recalls "Spaceship" in the lyrics "I love tripping in the desert with my best friends, seeing spaceships in the sky". The soul-influenced sixth track, "Honey", is built upon a guitar riff and lyrically debates a "man-stealing ex-friend" with "humour and a chummy chatty style that moves into a more natural narrative". "Cowboy Blues" lyrically analyzes "the ways in which loneliness can cloud one's instincts" and was compared to Lady Gaga's 2016 album Joanne and Taylor Swift's works.  The acoustic country ballad "Resentment" depicts a "relationship cracked apart by festering anger", with lyrics such as "I don't hate you, babe, it's worse than that / Cuz you hurt me, and I don't react." It features guest appearances by Brian Wilson, Sturgill Simpson, and Wrabel.

Nick Lowe of Clash labeled "Birthday Suit" as "the most brilliant thing [Kesha's] ever done". It is a "retro pop" song that samples musical elements from the Mario franchise and was compared to the works of Janet Jackson and Madonna. "Kinky" is a "suitably weird, wonderful and horny" electro–R&B song with elements of 1980s music and a "raunchy bassline". It has a featuring credit for Ke$ha, the stylization the singer used prior to Rainbow, and was compared to the works of Carly Rae Jepsen and the Spice Girls. Lyrically, the song sees the singer "celebrating kinks". Kesha sings about "preserving childlike innocence" in the "almost unbelievably bizarre" "Potato Song (Cuz I Want To)", which predominantly features oom-pah and saxophone. The singer said that the song is "about all the things that I want to do that, as an adult, are maybe kind of childish". Its polka influences were compared to Lily Allen's 2009 song "Never Gonna Happen". Thomas Green of The Arts Desk labeled it the album's best song.

The dream pop number "BFF" also features Wrabel, who is Kesha's long-time friend, and lyrically depicts their friendship. Kesha discourses about her absent father in "Father Daughter Dance". High Road ends with "Chasing Thunder", an "ode to wandering, and 'never growing up'" which was sonically compared to the work of Florence and the Machine. It has been described as a "distillation of the earnest, gravelly voice that made Kesha a star". The digital exclusive track "Summer" was compared to "Timber" and described as a "rather thought provoking, enjoyable pop track".

Promotion and singles 
In October 2019, to update her public on new releases, Kesha launched a hotline which featured a snippet of an upcoming song. Later that month the singer released a trailer to announce High Road release. "Raising Hell" was released as the album's lead single on October 24, 2019, alongside its music video, which was directed by Luke Gilford. In the United States, it peaked at number five on the Billboard Dance Club Songs chart and at number 17 on the Bubbling Under Hot 100 chart. Kesha and Freedia performed the song for the first time on Jimmy Kimmel Live! on October 28. On November 21, 2019, "My Own Dance" was issued as the follow-up single. A music video directed by Allie Avital premiered the same day. The song was sent to Australian contemporary hit radio stations in the following day. On November 24, 2019, at the 47th ceremony of the American Music Awards, Kesha performed "Raising Hell" and "Tik Tok". "Resentment" was sent to Australian contemporary hit radio stations as the album's third single on December 13, 2019, followed by "Tonight" as the fourth on January 31, 2020. A music video for "Resentment" was shot with Kesha's personal iPhone and released on December 12. Kesha and Freedia performed "Raising Hell" on The Late Show With Stephen Colbert on January 10. Acoustic versions of "Raising Hell" and "Resentment" were released on January 29. The following day, she performed "Resentment" alongside Wrabel on The Late Late Show with James Corden. On February 3, a music video for the album's title track was released. On February 10, Kesha performed "Tonight" during the Live with Kelly and Ryan after-Oscars show. On April 17, she performed "Resentment" during the Tonight Show Starring Jimmy Fallon via a live streaming from her house. On April 26, 2020, she appeared in GLAAD's event Together in Pride: You Are Not Alone, which will raise funds for LGBT-related organizations associated with CenterLink. On August 4, 2020, a video for "Little Bit of Love", directed by Kesha and Jonah Best premiered on MTV Live and MTVU as well as on Kesha's Vevo channel. An acoustic performance "Kinky" was uploaded to Kesha's official YouTube account on October 24, 2020.

Touring 

In January 2020, Kesha announced the High Road Tour, with Freedia joining her as an opening act. The first concert was scheduled to take place on April 23 in Sugar Land, Texas. The tour was initially postponed to late 2020 due to the COVID-19 pandemic on March 31, but then it was officially cancelled on May 1.

Cancelled dates 

The June 27, 2020 show is part of the Soundtrack Music Festival.

Commercial performance 
On February 9, 2020, High Road debuted at number seven on the US Billboard 200 albums chart with 45,000 album-equivalent units consumed, of which 35,000 were pure album sales, making it Kesha's fourth US top-ten album.

Critical reception 

High Road received positive reviews from contemporary music critics. The union of the personas approached by Kesha throughout her career, which occurs musically and lyrically on the album, received polarizing responses, with some critics praising the artist's uniqueness, while others pointed out a false personality construction. At Metacritic, which assigns a normalized rating out of 100 to reviews from mainstream critics, the album has an average score of 73 based on 19 reviews, indicating "generally favorable reviews". Aggregator AnyDecentMusic?  gave it 7.0 out of 10, based on their assessment of the critical consensus.

Adam White of The Independent praised the singer's maturity and confidence. The A.V. Club Annie Zaleski praised the album for its musical diversity and lyrical and emotional depth. Sal Cinquemani of Slant also praised the album's sentimental approach, despite labeling it as Kesha's "least consistent" album due to the variety of music genres. Nick Lowe of Clash complimented it for not sounding forced despite its versatility, writing that Kesha "searches deep and emancipates the embodiment of sheer delight". Writing for DIY, Elly Watson defined the album as an "overwhelmingly triumphant pop offering that sees Kesha back at her best and having shit tons of fun while doing it". The Guardian Aimee Cliff recognized the album as derived from the singer's early works with a "new sense of underlying self-awareness". Focusing on the same topic, Rob Sheffield of Rolling Stone praised Kesha's return to her party persona. Stephen Thomas Erlewine of AllMusic and Louise Bruton of The Irish Times particularly praised "My Own Dance" and Kesha's lyrical duplicity.

In a more mixed evaluation, Megan Buerger of Pitchfork summarized High Road as a setback following Rainbow, affirming that it "feels strained, scattershot, and loaded with tension, like someone trying to portray freedom and free-spiritedness—even a recovered sense of identity—who isn't quite there yet". She also criticized the album's premise, commenting that "it doesn’t feel like moving on, it feels like running away". Similarly, PopMatters Nick Malone discredited Kesha's attempts to unite the diverse sounds with which she has worked throughout her career and even devalued the investment to return to Kesha's partying identity. He compared Kesha's  concern with her audience's perception of herself to Miley Cyrus's fifth studio album Miley Cyrus & Her Dead Petz.

In June 2020, the album was included on Rolling Stone and American Songwriters list of the best albums of 2020 so far.

Track listing

Notes
  signifies an additional producer
  signifies a vocal producer

Credits and personnel 
Credits adapted from the album's liner notes, and organized in alphabetical order by surname.

Vocals 

 Kesha – lead vocals , backing vocals 
 Michael Allen – backing vocals 
 Jeff Bhasker – backing vocals 
 Ajay Bhattacharya – backing vocals 
 Tanisha Brooks – backing vocals 
 Hayley Chilton – backing vocals 
 Stuart Crichton – backing vocals 
 Chelcee Grimes – backing vocals 
 Chelsea Gillis – backing vocals 
 Josie Howell – backing vocals 
 Matt Jardine – backing vocals 
 Eric Leva – backing vocals 
 James Newman – backing vocals 
 Tayla Parx – backing vocals 
 Nate Ruess – backing vocals 
 Louis Schoorl – backing vocals 
 Pebe Sebert – backing vocals 
 Sturgill Simpson – featured vocals 
 Graynor Strand – backing vocals 
 Maelu Strange – backing vocals 
 Leeza Tierney – backing vocals 
 Brian Wilson – featured vocals 
 Stephen Wrabel – backing vocals , featured vocals

Instrumentation 

 Brianna Atwell – viola 
 Samantha Boshnack – trumpet 
 Jeff Bhasker – keyboards 
 Ajay Bhattacharyya – bass , drums , guitar , piano , synthesizer , horn , keyboards 
 Rebecca Chung Filice – cello 
 Jason Cressey – trombone 
 Stuart Crichton – bass , keyboards , guitar 
 Madi Diaz – guitar 
 Woitek Goral – alto saxophone 
 Chelcee Grimes – guitar 
 John Hill – drums , guitar , keyboards 
 Magnus Johansson – fluegelhorn , trumpet 
 Peter Johansson – trombone , tuba 
 Tomas Jonsson – baritone saxophone 
 Greg Kramer – trombone 
 Eric Leva – ukulele 
 Seth May-Patterson – viola 
 Rachel Nesvig – violin 
 Ahameful Oluo – trumpet 
 Omega – drums , organ 
 Hunter Perrin – guitar 
 Josh Rawlings – piano 
 Maria Scherer Wilson – cello 
 Louis Schoorl – bass, drums, guitar, piano 
 Jesse Siebenberg – guitar 
 The Swedish Brass Mafia – brass

Production 

 Jeff Bhasker – production 
 Rob Cohen – vocal production 
 Stuart Crichton – production 
 Daramola – additional production 
 John Hill – production 
 Kesha – production 
 Ryan Lewis – production 
 Blake Mares – vocal production 
 Skylar Mones – additional production 
 Omega – production 
 Drew Pearson – production 
 Louis Schoorl – production 
 Stint – production 
 Tainy – additional production 
 Brian Wilson – vocal production

Technical 

 Jeff Bhasker – programming 
 Ajay Bhattacharyya – programming 
 Dale Becker – mastering 
 Matias Byland – programming 
 Jon Castelli – mixing 
 Rob Cohen – engineering 
 Stuart Crichton – engineering and programming 
 Josh Deguzman – engineering 
 Scott Desmarais – assistant engineering 
 Anthony Dolhai – engineering 
 Matt Dyson – engineering 
 Isaiah Gage – string arrangement 
 Chris Galland – engineering 
 John Hill – programming 
 Stephen Hogan – engineering 
 Jeremie Inhaber – assistant engineering 
 Andrew Joslyn – string arrangement 
 Blake Mares – engineering 
 Manny Marroquin – mixing 
 Johnny Morgan – assistant engineering 
 Drew Pearson – engineering 
 Nick Rowe – engineering and vocal engineering 
 Louis Schoorl – programming 
 Wesley Seidman – vocal engineering 
 Matt Tuggle – engineering 
 Omega – programming 
 Hector Vega – assistant engineering

Design 
 Samantha Burkhart – styling
 Benjamin Lowy – photography
 Vittorio Masecchia – makeup artist, hair stylist
 Samantha Rhodes – assisting styling
 Brian Roettinger – creative direction, photography

Charts

Weekly charts

Year-end charts

Release history

References 

2020 albums
Kesha albums
Albums produced by Jeff Bhasker
Albums produced by Ryan Lewis
Kemosabe Records albums
RCA Records albums
Albums produced by Stuart Crichton
Albums produced by John Hill (record producer)
Albums produced by Drew Pearson (songwriter)
Albums produced by Louis Schoorl
Albums produced by Ajay Bhattacharya